PMN may refer to:

 National Mobilization Party (Partido da Mobilização Nacional), a political party in Brazil
 Podsafe Music Network, an Internet music archive
 Polymorphonuclear leukocytes, or granulocyte
 Polymorphonuclear neutrophil, the most abundant white blood cells in the peripheral blood of many mammals
 Promenade MRT station, Singapore (MRT station abbreviation)
 PMN mine, an anti-personnel mine
 Panglima Mangku Negara, a Malaysian honour